This is a demography of the population of The Bahamas including population density, ethnicity, education level, health of the populace, economic status, religious affiliations and other aspects of the population.

Ninety percent of the Bahamian population identifies as being primarily of African ancestry. About two-thirds of the population lives on New Providence Island (the location of Nassau), and about half of the remaining one-third lives on Grand Bahama (the location of Freeport).

The islands were sparsely settled and a haven for pirates until the late 18th century, when thousands of British Loyalists were given compensatory land grants following the American Revolution. Many new settlers were from the Southern United States and brought slaves with them to cultivate plantations. At the turn of the 20th century, the total population was 53,000.

School attendance is compulsory between the ages of 5 and 16. There are 158 public schools and 52 private schools in the Bahamas catering to more than 66,000 students. The College of the Bahamas, established in Nassau in 1974, provides programmes leading to associate's degrees and bachelor's degrees; the college is now converting from a two-year to a four-year institution.

Vital statistics

Structure of the population
Structure of the population (01.07.2013) (estimates):

Other demographic statistics
Demographic statistics according to the World Population Review in 2022.

One birth every 96 minutes	
One death every 180 minutes	
One net migrant every 480 minutes	
Net gain of one person every 144 minutes

Demographic statistics according to the CIA World Factbook, unless otherwise indicated.

Population
355,608 (2022 est.)
332,634 (July 2018 est.)

Ethnic groups
African descent 90.6%, White 4.7%, mixed 2.1%, other 1.9%, unspecified 0.7% (2010 est.)
note: data represent population by racial group

Age structure 

0-14 years: 21.7% (male 38,811/female 37,719)
15-24 years: 14.91% (male 26,636/female 25,945)
25-54 years: 43.56% (male 76,505/female 77,119)
55-64 years: 10.75% (male 17,508/female 20,391)
65 years and over: 9.08% (2021 est.) (male 12,587/female 19,434)

0-14 years: 22.39% (male 37,777 /female 36,686)
15-24 years: 16.01% (male 26,984 /female 26,281)
25-54 years: 44.1% (male 73,627 /female 73,068)
55-64 years: 9.45% (male 14,298 /female 17,140)
65 years and over: 8.05% (male 10,318 /female 16,455) (2018 est.)

Birth rate
14.64 births/1,000 population (2022 est.) Country comparison to the world: 118th
15.1 births/1,000 population (2018 est.) Country comparison to the world: 124th

Death rate 
6.41 deaths/1,000 population (2022 est.) Country comparison to the world: 139th
7.3 deaths/1,000 population (2018 est.) Country comparison to the world: 119th

Total fertility rate
1.98 children born/woman (2022 est.) Country comparison to the world: 111st
1.94 children born/woman (2018 est.) Country comparison to the world: 126th

Median age
total: 32.8 years. Country comparison to the world: 104th
male: 31.7 years
female: 34 years (2020 est.)

total: 32.3 years. Country comparison to the world: 102nd
male: 31.1 years 
female: 33.5 years (2018 est.)

Net migration rate
0 migrant(s)/1,000 population (2022 est.) Country comparison to the world: 84th

Population growth rate
0.82% (2022 est.) Country comparison to the world: 114th
0.79% (2018 est.) Country comparison to the world: 131st

Languages
English (official), Haitian Creole (among Haitian immigrants)

Religions 
Protestant 69.9% (includes Baptist 34.9%, Anglican 13.7%, Pentecostal 8.9% Seventh Day Adventist 4.4%, Methodist 3.6%, Church of God 1.9%, Brethren 1.6%), Roman Catholic 12%, other Christian 13% (includes Jehovah's Witness 1.1%), other 0.6%, none 1.9%, unspecified 2.6% (2010 est.)

Urbanization
urban population: 83.5% of total population (2022)
rate of urbanization: 1.02% annual rate of change (2020-25 est.)

Dependency ratios
total dependency ratio: 40.8 (2015 est.)
youth dependency ratio: 29.1 (2015 est.)
elderly dependency ratio: 11.7 (2015 est.)
potential support ratio: 8.5 (2015 est.)

Health

According to The World Factbook, the Bahamas has an HIV/AIDS prevalence rate of 1.9% (2017 est.)

Life expectancy at birth
total population: 76.13 years. Country comparison to the world: 107th
male: 73.2 years
female: 79.14 years (2022 est.)

Source: UN World Population Prospects

Obesity - adult prevalence rate
31.6% (2016). Country comparison to the world: 21st

Education expenditures
2.5% of GDP (2020) Country comparison to the world: 167th

Unemployment, youth ages 15–24
total: 25.8%. Country comparison to the world: 45th
male: 20.8% 
female: 31.6% (2016 est.)

References

 
Society of the Bahamas